Graduate School of Architecture, Planning and Preservation (GSAPP) is the architecture school of Columbia University, a private research university in New York City. It is regarded as an important and highly prestigious architecture school. It is also home to the Masters of Science program in Advanced Architectural Design, Historic Preservation, Real Estate Development, Urban Design, and Urban Planning.

The school's resources include the Avery Architectural and Fine Arts Library, the United States' largest architectural library and home to some of the first books published on architecture, as well as the origin of the Avery Index to Architectural Periodicals.

Recent deans of the school have included architect James Stewart Polshek (1972–1987), Bernard Tschumi (1988–2003), Mark Wigley (2004–2014), Amale Andraos (2014–2021), Weiping Wu (Interim Dean, 2022),
and Andrés Jaque (2022–).

History
The Graduate School of Architecture, Planning, and Preservation (GSAPP) has evolved over more than a century. It was transformed from a department within the Columbia School of Mines into a formal School of Architecture by William Robert Ware in 1881—making it one of the first such professional programs in the country.

While the number of specialized programs being offered by the school has multiplied over the years, architecture remains the intellectual core of the school.

Rankings
Columbia GSAPP has been ranked #2 among the Top Architecture Graduate Programs five times over the past ten years on Design Intelligence's ranking of programs accredited by the National Architectural Accrediting Board, including the 2020 rankings.

Notable faculty

Current faculty
Amale Andraos – Founder of WORKac Architects and former Dean (2014–2021)
Barry Bergdoll – Former Philip Johnson Chief Curator of Architecture and Design, MoMA
Patrice Derrington – Director of GSAPP's Real Estate Development Program
Andrew Dolkart – James Marston Fitch Professor of Historic Preservation. Former Director of the Historic Preservation Program (2008–2016)
Kenneth Frampton – Ware Professor of Architecture Emeritus
Mario Gooden – Interim Director of GSAPP's Master of Architecture Program
Juan Herreros – Founder of Abalos & Herreros
Steven Holl – Founder and Principal of Steven Holl Architects
Andrés Jaque – Dean of GSAPP, Director of its Advanced Architectural Design Program, Founder and Principal of Office for Political Innovation
Laura Kurgan – Director of GSAPP's Computational Design Program and Director of the Center for Spatial Research
LOT-EK – Ada Tolla and Giuseppe Lignano
Reinhold Martin – Former Director of the Temple Hoyne Buell Center for the Study of American Architecture
Kate Orff – Director of GSAPP's Architecture and Urban Design Program, Founder and Principal of SCAPE
Jorge Otero-Pailos – Director of GSAPP's Historic Preservation Program
Richard Plunz – Director of Urban Design Lab at the Earth Institute and Former Director of GSAPP's Architecture and Urban Design Program
Alexandra Quantrill
Michael Rock – Founder of 2 x 4, Director of Graphical Arch Studies
Karla Maria Rothstein – Director of Columbia University's DeathLAB; co-founder of Latent Productions
Hilary Sample – Founder and Principal of MOS Architects
Felicity Scott – Co-director of GSAPP's Critical, Curatorial, and Conceptual Practices in Architecture Program
Galia Solomonoff – architect of Dia:Beacon museum and founding creative director of Solomonoff Architecture Studio
Bernard Tschumi – designed Alfred Lerner Hall, Columbia's student center, former Dean (1988 to 2003)
Marc Tsurumaki - Founder of LTL Architects
Mary McLeod – Co-curator of the exhibition Charlotte Perriand: Interior Equipment,
Mark Wasiuta – Co-director of GSAPP's Critical, Curatorial, and Conceptual Practices in Architecture Program
Mark Wigley – directed the exhibition "Deconstructivist Architecture" at MoMA with Philip Johnson, former Dean (2004–2014)
Gwendolyn Wright
Weiping Wu – Director of GSAPP's Urban Planning Program and former Interim Dean

Former faculty

Charles Abrams
Stan Allen – Former Dean of Princeton School of Architecture
Tatiana Bilbao 
William A. Boring
Peter Cook – Member of Archigram
Harvey Wiley Corbett
Mark Cousins – Director of the History/ Theory Department at the AA London
Manuel de Landa (adjunct)
Neil Denari
Hernan Diaz Alonso
James Marston Fitch
Frank Gehry
Romaldo Giurgola
Percival Goodman
Zaha Hadid
Malo Huston – Dean of the School of Architecture at the University of Virginia (2021–)
Alfred Dwight Foster Hamlin
Wallace Harrison
Thomas Hastings
Henry Hornbostel
Bjarke Ingels
Gerhard Kallmann
Ada Karmi-Melamede
Michael David Kirchmann – Founder and CEO of GDSNY
Austin W. Lord – Dean from 1912–15
Greg Lynn
Peter Marcuse
Charles Follen McKim
Michael McKinnell
James Stewart Polshek – former dean of Columbia's architecture school; his projects include the Clinton Presidential Center in Little Rock; the Santa Fe Opera's Crosby Theatre in New Mexico; and 500 Park Avenue near Billionaires' Row in Manhattan
Hani Rashid – Asymptote
Jaquelin T. Robertson
Philippe Rahm
Michael Sorkin
Robert A.M. Stern – former Dean of Yale School of Architecture; his recent projects include the Four Seasons Hotel New York Downtown; the Harvard Business School's Bloomberg Center; and the Harvard Kennedy School's Rubenstein, Ofer, and Wexner buildings 
Raymond Unwin
William Robert Ware – designed numerous Venetian Gothic buildings for Harvard University
Michael Webb – member of Archigram
Lauretta Vinciarelli

Notable alumni

Abraham H. Albertson (1895), notable early 20th century architect in Seattle, Washington
Max Abramovitz (1931) – 1961 Rome Prize; designed Avery Fisher Hall at Lincoln Center, the United Nations complex, and the Assembly Hall 
David Aldrich, artist and architect
Grosvenor Atterbury (1884) – worked for Columbia campus architects McKim, Mead & White; designed Forest Hills Gardens
Richard F. Bach (1909) – curator of industrial arts at the Metropolitan Museum of Art
Turpin Bannister (M.S. 1928) – was one of the leading American architectural historians of his generation
Donn Barber (post-graduate architectural courses) – architect
William A. Boring – was an American architect; noted for, among other work, codesigning the Immigration Station at Ellis Island in New York harbor
Temple Hoyne Buell – designed over 300 buildings in Colorado; designed the first ever shopping mall
Paul Byard (M.S.) – a lawyer and an architect
Rosario Candela (B.A. 1915) – was an Italian American architect; achieved renown through his apartment building designs in New York City
Eric Cantor (M.S. 1989) – Congressman from Virginia and United States House Majority Leader
Minsuk Cho – Founder of Mass Studies
Brad Cloepfil – architect, educator 
Angela Co (MA, 2005) – 2011 Rome Prize
Jonas Coersmeier – award-winning architect and designer; a finalist and first runner-up in the World Trade Center Memorial Competition
Lonn Combs (MsAAD, 2001) – 2011 Rome Prize
William Adams Delano (1896) – architect, partner with Chester Holmes Aldrich in the firm of Delano & Aldrich
Andrew Dolkart (M.S. 1977) – authority on the preservation of historically significant architecture
Harry E. Donnell (Ph. B. 1887) – Beaux-Arts architect who designed The Grand Madison
Alden B. Dow (B.A. 1931) – architect; known for his prolific architectural design
Boris Dramov (M.Arch. 1970) – architect, urban designer, and President of ROMA Design Group
Peter Eisenman (1960) – designed the Memorial to the Murdered Jews of Europe in Berlin, amongst other work
Doug Farr (M.Arch. 1970) – architect and urban planner
Romaldo (Aldo) Giurgola (M.Arch) – Italian-American-Australian academic architect, professor, and author.
Nabil Gholam (M.S. in Urban Planning 1988) – architect, founder of award-winning architecture firms in Beirut
Philip L. Goodwin (1912) – co-designer of the original Museum of Modern Art, New York
Ferdinand Gottlieb (1953) – designed the original Rizzoli Bookstore 
Eric Gugler (1911) – designed the West Wing of the White House
Frances Halsband (M.S.) – architect who has served on juries for design awards and chaired the 1999 American Institute of Architects Committee on Design
Michael Hansmeyer (M.S.) – post-modern architect; utilizes algorithmic architecture techniques, generative art mentalities, and CAD software to generate complex structures
Arthur Loomis Harmon (1902) – co-designed Empire State Building; most famous as design partner of the firm Shreve, Lamb and Harmon
James Monroe Hewlett (Ph. B. 1890), painted the celestial mural in the Grand Central Terminal, father-in-law of inventor Buckminster Fuller
Henry Hornbostel (Ph. B. 1891) – American architect who designed the campus for Carnegie Mellon University and Emory University
John Ike – architect and partner of Ike Kligerman Barkley architectural firm
Mitchell Joachim (M. Arch. 1997) – acknowledged as an innovator in ecological design, architecture, and urban design
Rockwell Kent (1902) – painter
Robert Kohn (1890) – designed Congregation Emanu-El of the City of New York, the world's largest synagogue
Joseph Kosinski (1999) – directed Tron: Legacy; best known for his computer graphics and computer generated imagery work
Sylvia Lavin – a leading figure in contemporary architectural history, theory, and criticism
V. Everit Macy (1893) – industrialist and philanthropist; benefactor to Teachers College, Columbia University
Henry C. Pelton (1889) – co-designed Riverside Church in New York
Geeta Mehta – Indian-American social entrepreneur, urban designer, architect and author
Lewis F. Pilcher (1895) – State Architect of New York in the 1910s
Campion A. Platt (B.S. Arch) – architect; included in Architectural Digest (2010) as one of Top 100 Architects and Designers in the world
John Russell Pope (1894) – Rome Prize; designed the National Archives and the Jefferson Memorial in Washington, DC
Antoine Predock (B. Arch.) – architect, Rome Prize (1985); AIA Gold Medal (2006), National Design Award (2007)
Wallace A. Rayfield (B. Arch. 1899) – was the second formally educated practicing African American architect in the United States
Charles Renfro (1994) – principal, Diller Scofidio + Renfro; among the first architects to win a MacArthur Prize "genius grant"
Marcus T. Reynolds (1893), architect who designed the SUNY System Administration Building and The Albany Academy
James Rossant (1928-2009) – architect; best known for his master plan of Reston, Virginia, Lower Manhattan Plan, and UN-sponsored master plan for Dodoma, Tanzania
Friedrich St. Florian (M. Arch. 1961) – Austrian–American architect; Rome Prize; National World War II Memorial, Washington, D.C.
Ashley Schafer (1998) – founding editor of PRAXIS journal and curator of the US Pavilion at the 2014 Venice Biennale 
Sy Schulman (1954) – civil engineer and urban planner, Mayor of White Plains (1993–1997)
Ricardo Scofidio (1960) – founder, principal of Diller Scofidio + Renfro, first architects to win a MacArthur Prize "genius grant"; Royal Institute of British Architects
SHoP Architects (each of the six founding partners has a M.Arch. from GSAPP) – 2009 National Design Award for Architecture Design; firm's work in permanent collection, Museum of Modern Art
David Serero (M.S. Arch) – French architect; Rome Prize
Lawrence L. Shenfield (B. Arch. 1914) – advertising executive, instrumental in promoting Radio broadcasting during the 1920s and 30s; prominent philatelist, collector of Confederate postage stamps
Norma Merrick Sklarek (M.Arch 1950) – African American architect who accomplished many firsts for black women in architecture
Galia Solomonoff (M.Arch 1994) – architect, founder of Solomonoff Architecture Studio
Laurinda Hope Spear (M.S. Arch 1975) – architect and landscape architect; Rome Prize; one of the founders of Arquitectonica
Gustave E. Steinback (B.S. 1900) – architect; particularly known as designer of Roman Catholic schools and churches
Chauncey Stillman – American heir, grandson of James Stillman
Arthur Alexander Stoughton (Ph. B. 1888) – partner of Stoughton and Stoughton; founded the architecture department at the University of Manitoba
Max W. Strang (M.Arch 1988) – Miami based architect known for his Regional Modernist design; founding principal of Strang Design and recipient of Medal of Honor from Florida AIA
Sharon Sutton (M.Arch 1983) – professor, architecture and urban design; first African American woman to become a full professor in accredited architectural degree program
Alexander Tzannes (M.S. Arch & Urban Design) – Australian architect; founder of high-profile, multi-award-winning architectural practice Tzannes Associates
Samuel Breck Parkman Trowbridge (1883), partner of Trowbridge & Livingston; designed the St. Regis Hotel, American Red Cross National Headquarters, and 23 Wall Street
 UrbanLab (both founders, Martin Felsen and Sarah Dunn, graduated in 1994) – 2009 Latrobe Prize from the American Institute of Architects College of Fellows
Franklin B. Ware (B.S. Arch) – American architect best known for serving as the State architect of New York (1907–1912) 
Whitney Warren (attended 1883–1884), founder of Warren and Wetmore that designed New York City's Grand Central Terminal
Alexander McMillan Welch (1890), American architect who designed the Benjamin N. Duke House
Jan V. White (1952) – communication designer, educator and writer
John Louis Wilson Jr., (B.Arch 1928; 1898–1989), architect active in New York City; first Black graduate of the architecture program.

Research Centers

Center for Spatial Research
The Spatial Research Center was established in 2015 as a center for urban research that combines design, architecture, urbanism, humanities, and data science. It sponsors research, and curricular activities built around new technologies of mapping, data visualization, data collection and data analysis.

Center for Urban Real Estate
The Center for Urban Real Estate was founded in 2011 in order to address the challenges of a rapidly urbanizing world and the most complex problems of the real estate industry. From the concerns of inequitable socio-economic outcomes in the urban environment, through the spectacular revitalization of urban centers, such as Lower Manhattan, after the devastation of terrorism, natural disaster, and deteriorating infrastructure, to creating technological systems for optimized investment decisions, the Center serves as a forum for robust discussions and rigorous analysis by real estate professionals and scholars. A major current focus of the Center is the development of advanced applied technology that can be achieved by bridging the gap between the compelling needs of the real estate industry and the advanced research and resources in technology within the extensive Columbia University ecosystem.

Temple Hoyne Buell Center for the Study of American Architecture
The Buell Center was founded in 1982. Its mission is to advance the interdisciplinary study of American architecture, urbanism, and landscape. In recent years, the Center has convened issue-oriented conversations around matters of public concern, such as housing, that are addressed to overlapping constituencies including academics, students, professionals, and members of the general public. The Center's research and programming articulate facts and frameworks that modify key assumptions governing the architectural public sphere—that is, the arena in which informed public analysis and debate about architecture and urbanism takes place. The center is located in Buell Hall.

Columbia Laboratory for Architectural Broadcasting

Columbia Laboratory for Architectural Broadcasting (also known as C-Lab) was founded in 2005 by Jeffrey Inaba. It is an experimental research unit which investigates how cities would evolve and studies urban and architecture issues related to new technologies.

See also
Columbia University
Architecture

References

 
Columbia University
Architecture schools in New York City
Educational institutions established in 1881
1881 establishments in New York (state)